En el corredor de la muerte is a 2019 Spanish drama television miniseries, created by Ramón Campos, Gema R. Neira and Diego Sotelo and directed by Carlos Marqués-Marcet for Movistar+, that premiered in four parts on September 13, 2019. The series is based on the same-titled nonfiction book by Nacho Carretero.

Premise
The series depicts the judicial case that began in 1994 when club owner Casimir Sucharski and dancers Sharon Anderson and Marie Rodgers were found shot to death in Sucharski's house in Miramar, Florida. A poor quality surveillance video is the prosecution's main piece evidence against Pablo Ibar, a man of dual Spanish and American citizenship who had been arrested in a burglary incident. Ibar was first sentenced to capital punishment and spent sixteen years on death row, in an ongoing judicial process that has involved four trials.

Cast
 Miguel Ángel Silvestre as Pablo Ibar.
 Marisé Álvarez as Tanya Ibar, Pablo's wife.
 Ramón Agirre as Cándido Ibar, Pablo's father and a former Basque pelotari who emigrated to Florida in the 1960s.
 Laura de la Uz as Cristina Casas, Pablo's mother and Cándido's ex-wife.
 Pau Poch as Michael Ibar, Pablo's brother.
 Gianpiero Cognoli as Phil Gentile, Miramar Police detective.
 Simao Cayatte as Charles Bennet, Miramar Police detective.
 Nick Devlin as Benjamin Waxman, Pablo's attorney.
 Eric Goode as Mike Rowland, prosecutor.
 Ben Temple as Clay Monroe, Pablo's first attorney.
 Erick Miranda as Michael Abernazy.

Production 
En el corredor de la muerte is a Movistar+ original series produced in collaboration with Bambú Producciones. Ramón Campos, Teresa Fernández-Valdés, Diego Sotelo and Domingo Corral were credited as executive producers. The writing team was formed by Ramón Campos, Gema R. Neira, Diego Sotelo, Fran Navarro, David Moreno, Andrés Koppel and Carlos López. The episodes were directed by Carlos Marqués-Marcet.

Studio Canal handled the international sales.

Episodes

References

External links
 
 

2019 Spanish television series debuts
2019 Spanish television series endings
2010s Spanish drama television series
Spanish-language television shows
Television series based on actual events
Television series set in the 1990s
Television series set in the 2000s
Television shows set in Florida
Movistar+ network series
Television series by Bambú Producciones